The Union of the Right and Centre (UDC) is a term used in France to designate an electoral alliance between the parties of the right and of the centre.

Throughout the Fifth Republic, the Gaullist party  allied itself with smaller right and centre political formations in order to obtain a majority in the National Assembly or for local elections. Between 2002 and 2012, almost all of this movement was united in the Union for a Popular Movement which then defined itself as the "party of the right and of the center".

The term is subsequently used for the lists and candidacies presented by The Republicans party and its centrist allies (Union of Democrats and Independents and The Centrists).

With a view to the legislative elections of June 2022, the president of LR Christian Jacob unveiled during a National Congress organized on May 7, 2022, an agreement providing for mutual withdrawals between the three formations, including 457 candidates invested by LR, 59 by the UDI, 26 by LC and one by Liberties and Territories.

Chronology of the different alliances

References 

Political party alliances in France